HMAS Tolga was an auxiliary minesweeper which served in the Royal Australian Navy (RAN) during World War II.

Tolga was built in 1925 by the Walsh Island Dockyard & Engineering Works, Newcastle for Dorman Long, Sydney as Dorlonco. She was renamed in Sydney as the Sir T. Hugh Bell in 1926. She was sold to the Adelaide Steamship Company in 1930 and renamed Tolga. She was utilised along the Queensland coast as a sugar lighter between shore to larger vessels offshore. Tolga was requisitioned by the RAN in 1940 and commissioned as an auxiliary minesweeper. She was attached to Minesweeping Group 70, based at Darwin. In 1942, she was converted to a water carriers and later as a stores carrier. Purchased by the RAN in 1946, she was paid off on 3 March 1946. Surveys determined that she had deteriorated and was structurally unsafe to transport back to Australia.

Fate
Tolga was towed out to sea by the frigate  on 30 April 1946 and was scuttled off the north coast of New Guinea.

Battle honours
Following an overhaul of the RAN battle honours system, completed in March 2010, Tolgas wartime service was retroactively recognised with the honour "Darwin 1942–43".

References

1925 ships
Ships built in New South Wales
Auxiliary ships of the Royal Australian Navy
Maritime incidents in 1946
Minesweepers of the Royal Australian Navy
Coastal trading vessels of Australia
Iron and steel steamships of Australia
Scuttled vessels